Alfred Bathini Xuma, OLG, commonly referred to by his initials as AB Xuma (8 March 1893 – 27 January 1962), was the first black South African to become a medical doctor, as well as a leader, activist and president-general of the African National Congress (ANC) from 1940 to 1949. He was a member of the African American founded Alpha Phi Alpha fraternity.

Life
Although on the left wing of the ANC, Xuma was seen during his leadership as too conservative by an increasingly impatient and activist youth, which he regarded in turn with suspicion. (His letters to colleagues are understood to be full of hostile references to communists.) As such, he was widely regarded as out of touch with the needs and demands of the grassroots.

Nevertheless, it was under his leadership, albeit after having been very cannily lobbied, and in spite of warnings from his colleagues that it would lead to his downfall, that the ANC in 1942 established its Youth League.

A young Nelson Mandela was among the activists present (including Walter Sisulu, Congress Mbata, and William Nkomo) who in 1944 visited his home in Sophiatown to agitate for his acceptance of the league's manifesto and draft constitution. Mandela recalls having been impressed at how "grand" Xuma's house was, as well as by his revitalisation of the ANC: Xuma had succeeded in regularising membership and subscriptions, and had greatly improved the movement's finances. To Mandela, however, and many other young Africans of the time,

he represented the old way of doing things: deputations, statements, committees—gentlemen politics in the British tradition.  As a man so recently being groomed to become a 'black Englishman' himself, Mandela understood how all that worked.  But now there were new voices around him, offering an increasing militant approach.

Xuma responded very angrily and sarcastically after reading what he called their "high-learned" manifesto, which explicitly criticized the ANC's failure to advance the national cause, as well as its deficiencies in organisation and constitution, and its "erratic policy of yielding to oppression, regarding itself as a body of gentlemen with clean hands." Xuma rounded on the deputation for usurping the authority of the ANC national executive, but refrained from criticizing publicly a cause he had publicly championed.  Thus outmaneuvered, he gave the ANC Youth League his blessing, having secured an agreement that the ANC itself would remain the dominant body

Legacy
After his death his book collection was given to Orlando East Public Library by his widow, Madie Hall Xuma. This library was the first purpose built public library in Soweto.

His home currently serves as the Sophiatown Heritage and Cultural Centre.

Notes and references

nationalism

1893 births
1962 deaths
People from the Eastern Cape
Xhosa people
Presidents of the African National Congress
South African anti-communists
Members of the Order of Luthuli